There are 53 municipalities of Finland in which Finnish is not the sole official language. In Finland, as of December 31, 2013, 89.3% of the population speak Finnish, 5.3% Swedish and 0.04% Sami languages. Both Finnish and Swedish are official languages of Finland. Officially, a municipality is bilingual if the minority language group consists of at least 8% of the population, or at least 3,000 speakers. A previously bilingual municipality remains so if the linguistic minority proportion drops below 8%, up to 6%. If it drops below 6%, it is possible for the municipality to remain bilingual by government decree, on the recommendation of the municipal council, for a further ten years. Municipalities that make use of the 3,000-speaker rule include the national capital Helsinki and the cultural center of Swedish Finns, Turku. On the Åland archipelago, where Finnish is almost absent from daily life, the language law does not apply. On the mainland, the highest proportion of Swedish-speakers is found on the western coast, in Ostrobothnia.

Of the 310 Finnish municipalities, 16 are monolingually Swedish. 33 municipalities are bilingually Finnish and Swedish; of these, 15 have a Swedish-speaking majority and 18 a Finnish-speaking one. Four municipalities, all located in Lapland, have a Finnish-speaking majority and a Sami-speaking minority: Enontekiö, Inari, Sodankylä and Utsjoki. Initially, only Swedish was accorded official bilingualism, through a language act of 1922; similar provisions were extended to Sami through a 1991 law. The 1922 law was replaced by new but largely similar legislation in 2003.

Municipalities

See also

Languages of Finland
Swedish-speaking Finns
List of Finnish municipalities
Names of places in Finland in Finnish and in Swedish

References

Swedish-speaking and bilingual municipalities
Language policy in Finland
Politics of Finland
Municipalities of Finland
Linguistic rights
Finland Swedish
Finnish language
Languages of Finland
Sámi-language municipalities
Sociolinguistics lists
Language geography